Richard Hrair Dekmejian (born 1933, Aleppo, Syria) is an Armenian-American Professor Emeritus of political science at the University of Southern California in Los Angeles (retired May 2017).  He also served as the Director of the USC Institute of Armenian Studies from 2005-2012. His teachings are primarily focused on world leadership and comparative and international politics. Professor Dekmejian splits his research efforts between National Security issues, International Mediation, Middle East/Islamic Studies, Political Elites, Comparative Genocides, and Terrorism.  

He is the author of several books including Islam in Revolution: Fundamentalism in the Arab World (1995) and Spectrum of Terror (2007) and co-author with Joseph A. Kechichian of The Just Prince: A Manual of Leadership (2003).
He has appeared as a world affairs commentator on radio and television programs, been quoted in major newspapers and publications, written and received several research grants, delivered numerous presentations at professional conferences, and served as a consultant to foreign governments and various U.S. government agencies.
He earned a B.A. at University of Connecticut, an M.A. at Boston University, and a Ph.D. at Columbia University in 1966.  Dekmejian also served honorably in the U.S. Army. During his time in the U.S. Army, he was stationed in France.

In the aftermath of the Cold War and increasing political tension and violence, Professor Dekmejian began offering Political Science 366: Terrorism and Genocide--a course at the University of Southern California. His systematic analysis of unconventional forms of political violence between states and nonstate entities led him to construct a single continuum--the spectrum of political violence--ranging from micro-level acts of terrorism like assassinations, bombings, and violence perpetrated by individuals or small, domestically focused groups to transnational violence like that perpetrated by al-Qaida to macro-level state-sponsored atrocities, massacres, and genocides.

Bibliography
Dekmejian, R. Hrair, 1933- Spectrum of terror / R. Hrair Dekmejian. Washington, D.C. : CQ Press, 2007. 370 p.  (alk. paper)
Kechichian, Joseph A. and Dekmejian, R. Hrair, 1933- The just prince : a manual of leadership / Joseph A. Kechichian and R. Hrair Dekmejian. London : Saqi Books, 2003. 360 p. 
Dekmejian, R. Hrair, 1933– Islam in revolution : fundamentalism in the Arab world / R. Hrair Dekmejian. 2nd ed. Syracuse, N.Y. : Syracuse University Press, 1995. xv, 307 p. : ill. ; 23 cm.  (alk. paper)
Dekmejian, R. Hrair, 1933– Troubled waters : the geopolitics of the Caspian Region / R. Hrair Dekmejian and Hovann H. Simonian. London : I.B. Tauris, 2001. vi, 271 p. : ill., 1 map ; 25 cm. 
Dekmejian, R. Hrair, 1933– Egypt under Nasir; a study in political dynamics / R. Hrair Dekmejian. [1st ed.] Albany, State University of New York Press, 1971. xvi, 368 p. illus., port. 25 cm. 
Dekmejian, R. Hrair, 1933– Patterns of political leadership : Egypt, Israel, Lebanon / R. Hrair Dekmejian. Albany : State University of New York Press, 1975. xi, 323 p. : ill. ; 24 cm.   

1933 births
American political scientists
Boston University alumni
Columbia University alumni
Living people
American people of Armenian descent
University of Connecticut alumni
University of Southern California faculty
Ethnic Armenian historians
People from Aleppo